The Special Police Units or Police Special Units (PJP) was a special police force unit of Serbia's Ministry of Internal Affairs (MUP). It had several detachments and was part of the sector of the State Security Service. It was disbanded on 28 June 2001 when it was replaced by the re-establishment of the Gendarmery.

Between 1994 and 1996 it was commanded by Obrad Stevanović. During the Kosovo War (1998–99), the force had an estimated 5,000 or 7,000 men. The PJP detachments were based at Belgrade, Novi Sad, Kragujevac, Užice, Niš and Priština. It is believed that it was commanded by Obrad Stevanović, now the head of police. Its elite unit was the "Lightning" (Munje) unit, according to M. McAllester partly made up of "some of Yugoslavia's most dangerous criminals". Among other special units active in the war was the Special Anti-Terrorist Unit (SAJ), a separate part of the MUP.

See also
 Special forces of Serbia

References

Sources

External links

PJP
PJP
Non-military counterterrorist organizations
Specialist law enforcement agencies of Serbia
Kosovo War
2001 disestablishments in Serbia
Government agencies disestablished in 2001